The First Free School Society of Alexandria was a 19th-century organization that provided financial support for the development of schools for African Americans in Alexandria, Virginia.

History 
The First Free School Society of Alexandria was established for the purpose of supporting the creation of schools for Africans American students in Alexandria, Virginia. The society helped to raise funds needed for the construction of local schools, including the Snowden School for Boys and the Hallowell School for Girls. Both schools opened in 1867.

The society is honored on Alexandria's African American Heritage Memorial.

Trustees 

 George L. Seaton
 George W. Bryant
 Anthony L. Perpener
 Hannibal King
 James Piper
 George P. Douglas
 John H. Davis
 Samuel W. Madden
 J. Mck. Ware
 Charles Watson
 George W. Parker
 Rev. Clem Robinson
 George W. Sims

References 

Education in Alexandria, Virginia